was a Japanese actor. He primarily acted in dramas, of which a handful are tokusatsu series. One of his latest roles was as Taiga Saejima in the tokusatsu series GARO. He also played Kamen Rider Gaoh in the Kamen Rider Den-O movie, Kamen Rider Den-O: I'm Born!.

Life
Watanabe was born on December 9, 1955, in Mito, Ibaraki Prefecture. He graduated from Takushoku University, Faculty of Commerce. During his studies at the university, he learned German while working for the German airline company Lufthansa.

Watanabe began his career in entertainment by appearing in a Coca-Cola television commercial in 1980.

He married actress  in 1994.

Watanabe was found dead at his private gym in the basement of his home on May 3, 2022, and his death was announced by his management agency on May 5. The cause of death was reportedly suicide by hanging.

Filmography

Films
 On the Road (1982)
 Shinjuku Outlaw (1994)
 Gamera: Guardian of the Universe (1995)
 Gamera 2: Attack of Legion (1996)
 Gamera 3: Revenge of Iris (1999)
 Godzilla, Mothra and King Ghidorah: Giant Monsters All-Out Attack (2001) – Yutaka Hirose
 Cromartie High - The Movie (2005) - Freddie
 Kamen Rider Den-O: I'm Born! (2007) - Kamen Rider Gaoh
 Everly (2014) - Taiko
 Day and Night (2019)
 In Full Bloom (2020) - Tetsuro Tokugawa
 Iyashi no Kokoromi (2020)
 Labyrinth of Cinema (2020)
 A Dog Named Palma (2021)
 Nobutora (2021) - Oda Nobunaga
 Tears of Persephone (2022)
 Popran (2022)
 1446: An Eternal Minute (2022)
 Sadako DX (2022, released posthumously)
 Tora no Ryūgi (2022, released posthumously)
 Tora no Ryūgi 2 (2022, released posthumously)
 Ginji the Speculator (2022, released posthumously)
 Ginpei-cho Cinema Blues (2023, released posthumously)

Television
 Ai no Arashi (1986), adult Takeshi (Japanese adaptation of Wuthering Heights)
 Tōyama no Kin-san (1992)
 Onihei Hankachō (1994)
 Ultraman Gaia (1998) - Commander Akio Ishimuro
 Aoi (2000) - Asano Yoshinaga
 Oyabun wa Jesus Sama (2000) – Jesus Christ
 Toshiie and Matsu (2002) - Ikeda Tsuneoki
 GARO (2005-2006) – Taiga Saejima
 GARO: Beast of the White Night (2006) – Taiga Saejima
 LoveDeath (2006)
 Karate-Robo Zaborgar (2011)
 No Side Manager (2019) - Saburō Tsuda

Japanese dubbing
 Batman – Bruce Wayne (Michael Keaton)
 Batman Returns – Bruce Wayne (Michael Keaton)
 Cocktail (1991 Fuji TV edition) – Brian Flanagan (Tom Cruise)
 Top Gun (1989 Fuji TV edition) – Maverick (Tom Cruise)

References

External links 
 Unicorn-net.com - Watanabe's official website
 

1955 births
2022 deaths
2022 suicides 
20th-century Japanese male actors
21st-century Japanese male actors
Japanese male film actors
Japanese male television actors
Japanese male voice actors
People from Mito, Ibaraki
Suicides by hanging in Japan
Takushoku University alumni